Dila District may refer to:
 Dila District, Somalia
 Dila District, Afghanistan

District name disambiguation pages